Mariske Strauss (born 16 May 1991) is a South African cross-country mountain biker.

Career

2020 
Strauss wins the 4 day stage trace, Tankwa Trek with partner Candice Lill.

2019 
Racing as Silverback Fairtree, Strauss teamed up with Swedish rider Jennie Stenerhag to win the 4 day Momentum Health Tankwa Trek presented by Biogen. The duo also raced together at the 2019 ABSA Cape Epic.

2018 
Strauss raced as a part of UCI World cup team, Silverback OMX Pro Team. She won the South African Mountain Bike Cross-country championship. Raced with Annie Last to finish 3rd overall on the podium at the ABSA Cape Epic

2017 
Strauss crowned 2017 South African National Cross-country Champion at Mankele Mountain Bike Park.

In 2017 Strauss teamed up with Annie Last, for the ABSA Cape Epic and finished in 2nd place overall.

2014
She won South African National women’s cross-country title at Thaba Trails, Gauteng.

References 

Cross-country mountain bikers
South African female cyclists
1991 births
Living people
20th-century South African women
21st-century South African women